Thunder Lake is a hamlet in central Alberta within the County of Barrhead No. 11.

Demographics 
Thunder Lake recorded a population of 34 in the 1991 Census of Population conducted by Statistics Canada.

See also 
List of communities in Alberta
List of hamlets in Alberta

References 

County of Barrhead No. 11
Hamlets in Alberta